Raphidascaris is a genus of nematodes belonging to the family Raphidascarididae.

The species of this genus are found in Europe, Australia and Northern America.

Species:
 Hysterothylacium analarum Rye & Baker, 1984 
 Hysterothylacium incurvum Rudolphi, 1819

References

Nematodes